Bandabardò is an Italian folk band. It was formed in 1993. Bandabardò is noted as a live band. Their album Tre Passi Avanti charted at No. 7 in Italy the week of its release, and Bondo! Bondo! charted at No. 10.

Members include Enrico Greppi, called Erriquez (vocals and guitar), Alessandro Finazzo (voice and guitar), Marco Bachi (bass), Andrea Orlandini (keyboard), Alessandro Nutini (percussion), and Jose Ramon Caravallo Arma (percussion and trumpet). The band hails from Florence, and members have spoken about the state of live music in their city. Erriquez died on the morning of 14 February 2021, at the age of 60 from cancer.

References

External links
 
 

Italian folk music groups
Folk rock groups
Musical groups established in 1993
1993 establishments in Italy
Musical groups from Florence